Oldřich I of Rosenberg (died 4 March 1390) was the fourth son of the Peter I of Rosenberg and his second wife, . Together with his mother and brothers, he founded a Minorite monastery in Český Krumlov.

After the death of his older brother , Oldřich became head of the Rosenberg family. Between 1381 and 1382, together with his brothers and Jindřich of Hradec, Oldřich militarily supported Jindřich of Schaunberg in his dispute with Albert III, Duke of Austria. The dispute was eventually mediated by Czech King Wenceslas IV.

Citations

References

14th-century births
1390 deaths
14th-century Bohemian people
Medieval Bohemian nobility
Rosenberg family